Nights in the Gardens of Spain may refer to:

Nights in the Gardens of Spain, G. 49 (originally Noches en los jardines de España), piece of music by the Spanish composer Manuel de Falla (1876–1946)
Nights in the Gardens of Spain (novel), semi-autobiographical novel published by Witi Ihimaera. Kawa (see below) was a film adaptation of the book
Nights in the Gardens of Spain (film), also known as Kawa, was a 2010 New Zealand coming out film directed by Katie Wolfe based on Witi Ihimaera's work (see above)
"Nights in the Gardens of Spain" is one of the monologues in the BBC television series Talking Heads